Saint-Nicolas, Belgium may refer to the following places:

Saint-Nicolas, East Flanders, French name for Sint-Niklaas, in the Province of East Flanders
Saint-Nicolas, Liège, in the province of Liège, Wallonia

See also
Saint Nicolas